Denmark–Romania relations refers to the current and historical relations between Denmark and Romania. Denmark has an embassy in Bucharest, and Romania has an embassy in Copenhagen. Relations between Denmark and Communist Romania was described in the 1960s as "good" by Prime Minister of Romania Ion Gheorghe Maurer. In 2008, Danish export to Romania amounted 1,644 million DKK, while Romanian export amounted 475 million DKK. Both countries are members of the European Union and NATO.

History
In 1879, two Romanian statesmen under King Carol I of Romania, visited Denmark, establishing the official relations between Denmark and Romania. In 1880, Denmark opened the first consulate in Bucharest, to help Romanians settle in Denmark. The city of Aarhus was the first city, Romanians immigrated to. Diplomatic relations between Denmark and Romania were established on 13 April 1917.

During the World War I, Denmark opened two prisoner-of-war camp. The reason was to protect, heal and recover the Romanian prisoners.

During World War II, when Nazi Germany invaded Denmark, the relations between Denmark and Romania were suspended. In 1946, relations were re-established. In 1965, a payments agreement was signed. In 1967, an economic, industrial and technical cooperation agreement was signed. In 1980 and in 1994, both countries signed an investment agreement.

From 1975 to 1989, the number of Romanian asylum applications in Denmark totaled 505. In 2008, 246 Romanians immigrated to Denmark while in 2011, 710 Romanians immigrated to Denmark. In three years, Romanian immigration rose 289 percent.

Cooperation
In 2003, Denmark and Romania agreed to cooperate on a climate project, the first Danish project in Eastern Europe. The project assists Romania with replacing wood waste products for new technology, to provide heating to the poor regions of Romania.

High level visits
In May 2000, Queen Margrethe II and Prince Henrik visited Romania. During their visit, they visited the orphanage Sfanta Macrina which is run by DanChurchAid.
Danish Prime Minister Anders Fogh Rasmussen visited Romania in September 2003. During his visit he met Prime Minister of Romania Adrian Năstase. Romanian President Ion Iliescu visited Denmark in 2004. In 2006, Anders Fogh Rasmussen visited Romania, to make a speech at the annual meeting of the Romanian ambassadors.

Diplomacy

Kingdom of Denmark
Bucharest (Embassy) 

Republic of Romania
Copenhagen (Embassy)

See also
Foreign relations of Denmark
Foreign relations of Romania 
Princess Marie of Romania
Helen of Greece and Denmark (Wife of Carol II of Romania)

References

 
Romania
Bilateral relations of Romania